The 1948–49 Scottish League Cup final was played on 12 March 1949, at Hampden Park in Glasgow and was the final of the third Scottish League Cup competition. The final was contested by Rangers and Raith Rovers. Rangers won the match 2–0 thanks to goals by Torrance Gillick and Willie Paton.

Match details

References

External links

1949 03
League Cup Final
Scottish League Cup Final 1949 03
Scottish League Cup Final 1949 03
1940s in Glasgow
March 1949 sports events in the United Kingdom